

National Order of the Arrow Conference
The National Order of the Arrow Conference (NOAC) is a multi-day event which usually takes place on a university campus east of the Mississippi River, bringing together thousands of delegates from Order of the Arrow lodges around the nation for training and activities.

NOACs are held every two years, with exceptions made to align the event with significant anniversaries. In particular, the deferral from 2008 to 2009 aligned the schedule with the Order of the Arrow's 100th anniversary in 2015 and avoided a conflict with the 2010 National Scout Jamboree (which was similarly deferred from 2009 to align its schedule with the Boy Scouts of America's 100th anniversary in 2010). Similarly, the deferrals from 1985 to 1986 and from 1960 to 1961 aligned the schedule with the OA's 75th and 50th anniversaries in 1990 and 1965, respectively. The 2020 conference also had to be delayed to 2022 due to COVID-19, with people up to age 23 allowed to attend instead of 21.

Grand Lodge Meetings
In 1927, the decision was made to hold regional meetings in alternate years to national Grand Lodge Meetings. The Grand Lodge Meeting was delayed from 1935 to 1936 to avoid a conflict with the planned 1935 National Jamboree. In 1936, the event name was changed to National Lodge Meeting.

Table of Events

 NCLS = National Conservation and Leadership Summit
 TOAP = The Outdoor Adventure Place

See also

National Scout jamboree

Notes

References

External links

Order of the Arrow
Scouting events
Events in the United States
Scouting-related lists